John Torkington, D.D. (b & d Little Stukeley 26 March 1742 - 11 July 1815) was Master of Clare College from 1781 until his death.

Torkington was educated at Clare College, Cambridge. He became Fellow in 1768.  He was ordained a priest in the Church of England in 1771. He held incumbencies at Little Stukeley, Patrington, Stapleford and Teigh. Torkington was Vice-Chancellor of the University of Cambridge between 1783 and 1784.

References

Masters of Clare College, Cambridge
Fellows of Clare College, Cambridge
Alumni of Clare College, Cambridge
1815 deaths
1742 births
People from Huntingdonshire
19th-century English Anglican priests
18th-century English Anglican priests
Vice-Chancellors of the University of Cambridge